Bruunshåb is a little town in Viborg Municipality, Denmark. The town was established in 1821 around Bruunshaab Gamle Papfabrik.

References

External links 
 Bruunshaab Gl. Papfabrik 
 Bruunshaab Gl. Papfabrik 
 Viborg Kommune 

Cities and towns in the Central Denmark Region
Viborg Municipality